Angers Sporting Club de l'Ouest, commonly referred to as Angers SCO or simply Angers, is a French professional football club based in Angers in Pays de la Loire in western France. The club was founded in 1919 and plays in Ligue 1, the first division of Football in France, having achieved promotion to the league in 2015 after 21 years. It plays its home matches at the Stade Raymond Kopa. The club has played 23 seasons in the French top flight.

History
The team was founded in 1919, the same year the FFF was founded.

During the team's history, it has bounced between the top two tiers on multiple occasions. However, it did spend time in the third tier on several occasions; the 2006–07 season was its last season in the third tier.

The first season that Angers debuted in the French second division was in 1945. During this season, Angers SCO was placed in the North group; at that time, the second division was split into two groups, the North and South. Angers finished third, being seven points short of Stade Français, which was promoted to the first division.

In the 2014–15 Ligue 2 season, the team achieved promotion after a long time being in the lower division.

During the 2015–16 Ligue 1 season, SCO placed ninth in the final standings. In its opening league match against Montpellier, Angers won the match 2–0.

On May 28, 2017, Angers played in the 2017 Coupe de France final against Paris Saint-Germain. Angers lost the match 1–0 courtesy of 91st minute own goal. At the end of the 2017–18 Ligue 1 season, Angers finished 14th on the table and Cameroon striker Karl Toko Ekambi finished with an impressive 17 goals in the competition.

In the 2018–19 Ligue 1 season, Angers finished in a respectable 13th position on the table.

On 8 June 2020, Angers broke their own transfer fee record by signing Paul Bernardoni from Bordeaux, in a deal worth 8 million euros.

On 30 April 2021 Angers, along with Paris FC, were handed a transfer ban by FIFA for violation of regulations regarding relay transfers in August 2020. The ban was effective for the summer 2021 transfer window.

League participations

 Ligue 1: 1956–68, 1969–75, 1976–77, 1978–81, 1993–94, 2015–present
 Ligue 2: 1945–56, 1968–69, 1975–76, 1977–78, 1981–93, 1994–96, 2000–01, 2003–05, 2007–15
 National: 1996–2000, 2001–03, 2005–07
 Regional League: 1931–39
 Division d'Honneur: 1919–31
 Coupe de France runners-up: 1957, 2017

Players

Current squad

On loan

Current technical staff

Notable players 
Below are the notable former players who have represented Angers in league and international competition since the club's foundation in 1919. To appear in the section below, a player must have either played in at least 80 official matches for the club or represented his country's national team either while playing for Angers or after departing the club.

For a complete list of Angers SCO players, see :Category:Angers SCO players

 Jean-Marie Aubry
 Marc Berdoll
 Stéphane Bruey
 Thierry Cygan
 Cédric Daury
 Jean-Pierre Dogliani
 Jean-Marc Guillou
 Kazimir Hnatow
 Raymond Kopa
 Guy Moussi
 Ulrich Ramé
 Steve Savidan
 André Strappe
 Jean Vincent
 Amar Rouaï
 Paul Alo'o
 Fahid Ben Khalfallah
 Vili Ameršek
 Boško Antić
 Milan Damjanović
 Vladica Kovačević
 Claudiu Keserü
 Emil Săndoi
 Karl Toko Ekambi

Managers

Sponsors

Some official sponsors of Angers SCO football club:

Open energie  
The Paris-based energy company was announced as an Official Partner of the club in May 2021 on a three-year deal. Since the start of the 2021-22 season, Open Energie serves as the back-of-shirt sponsor for Angers’ matchday shirts, right below the kit number.

Atoll 
Atoll is a shopping mall located in Beaucouzé, near the commune of Angers. It also serves as an Official Partner to Angers SCO. Since November 2020, Atoll houses an official club store on a permanent basis.

Système U 
The Rungis-headquartered French retailers’ cooperative is a long-time sponsor of the club. Currently, it serves as one of their Official Partners, with its logo appearing on the front of Angers’ matchday shorts.

In May 2021, a U convenience store was opened in the Les Hauts de Saint-Aubin district of Angers.

Kappa 
The Turin-headquartered Italian sportswear brand has been the technical partner of the club since 2013, supplying them with matchday kits, training and non-playing staff’s uniforms and off-pitch lifestyle ranges.

In April 2019, the two parties renewed their partnership in a four-year agreement.

References

External links 

 

 
Association football clubs established in 1919
Sport in Angers
1919 establishments in France
Football clubs in Pays de la Loire
Ligue 1 clubs